Cyperus lhotskyanus is a species of sedge that is native to south eastern parts of Australia.

See also 
 List of Cyperus species

References 

lhotskyanus
Plants described in 1884
Flora of Victoria (Australia)
Flora of New South Wales
Flora of South Australia
Taxa named by Johann Otto Boeckeler